Nunavik Peninsula is a large peninsula in northwestern Greenland. It separates two cultural and geographical regions of northwestern Greenland: Uummannaq Fjord region in the southeast, and Upernavik Archipelago in the north.

Geography 
The waters around the peninsula are Karrat Fjord in the east, Nordost Bay in the south and Baffin Bay in the west. The Ukkusissat Fjord carves deeply into the northeast of the peninsula, running south to north-east-north around the eastern part of the peninsula covered with the Sermikavasak glacier.

Inner fjords 
Several fjords cut deep into the peninsula.  Running from the western shore inland to then turn north, Sullua (4x50km) is the main waterway, cutting the peninsula into two parts, northwestern being the smaller. Parallel Umiiviup Kangerlua (4x8km) and Kangiusap Imaa (3x7km) fjord bays cut into the southeastern shore.

Settlements 
The peninsula is administered as part of the Avannaata municipality. It is largely uninhabited − permanent settlements are located in the Upernavik Archipelago off the north-west-northern coast of the peninsula, including Upernavik Kujalleq, Kangersuatsiaq, Upernavik town, and  Aappilattoq. There are several settlements on the islands off the southwestern coast, including Nuugaatsiaq and Illorsuit in the Uummannaq Fjord system. Ukkusissat is the only mainland settlement in the vicinity, located on the smaller, Ukkusissat Peninsula.

Geology 
Rocks and sediments on Nunavik Peninsula are of Cretaceous and Paleocene origin, with further layers deposited during the movement of Greenland towards the North Pole. Similarly to the Uummannaq area, ancient volcanic basalts are exposed throughout the peninsula.

References

External links 
 1:250000 map of the peninsula at Greenland-guide.gl

Peninsulas of the Upernavik Archipelago
Uummannaq Fjord